Beno Eckmann (31 March 1917 – 25 November 2008) was a Swiss mathematician who made contributions to algebraic topology, homological algebra, group theory, and differential geometry.

Life

Born in Bern, Eckmann received his master's degree from Eidgenössische Technische Hochschule Zürich (ETH) in 1939. Later he studied there under Heinz Hopf, obtaining his Ph.D. in 1941. Eckmann was the 2008 recipient of the Albert Einstein Medal.

Legacy
Calabi–Eckmann manifolds, Eckmann–Hilton duality, the Eckmann–Hilton argument, and the Eckmann–Shapiro lemma are named after Eckmann.

Family
Eckmann's son is mathematical physicist Jean-Pierre Eckmann.

References

External links
 
 
Biography of Beno Eckmann

1917 births
2008 deaths
People from Bern
20th-century Swiss mathematicians
21st-century  Swiss  mathematicians
ETH Zurich alumni
Academic staff of ETH Zurich
Topologists
Albert Einstein Medal recipients